Owen Coachman House is located in Lower Township, Cape May County, New Jersey. The original one-room house was built between 1695 and 1700 in Townbank along Delaware Bay. It was moved to its present location on Shunpike Road on Cape Island in 1846. It was added to the National Register of Historic Places in September 2005.

Restoration work performed on the property in the early 2000s won an award from the New Jersey Department of Environmental Protection for its quality and sensitivity to the historic nature of the house.

See also
National Register of Historic Places listings in Cape May County, New Jersey

References

Houses completed in 1846
Houses in Cape May County, New Jersey
Houses on the National Register of Historic Places in New Jersey
Lower Township, New Jersey
National Register of Historic Places in Cape May County, New Jersey
New Jersey Register of Historic Places